Grigor Dimitrov was the defending champion, but lost in the second round to Gilles Müller. Andy Murray won the title, defeating Kevin Anderson in the final in straight sets.

Seeds

Draw

Finals

Top half

Bottom half

Qualifying

Seeds

Qualifiers

Qualifying draw

First qualifier

Second qualifier

Third qualifier

Fourth qualifier

References

Main Draw
Qualifying Draw

Aegon Championships - Singles
2015 Aegon Championships